is a Taiwanese-born Japanese rugby union player who plays as a prop. He currently plays for Shizuoka Blue Revs in Japan's domestic Japan Rugby League One. He was signed to the Sunwolves squad for the 2020 Super Rugby season, but did not make an appearance for the side.

References

1998 births
Living people
People from Tainan
Sportspeople from Tainan
Japanese rugby union players
Taiwanese rugby union players
Rugby union props
Sunwolves players
Shizuoka Blue Revs players